United Natural Foods, Inc. (UNFI) is a Providence, Rhode Island–based natural and organic food company. The largest publicly traded wholesale distributor of health and specialty food in the United States and Canada, it is Whole Foods Market's main supplier, with their traffic making up over a third of its revenue in 2018.

History
UNFI was founded in 1996 by the merger of two regional distributors, Mountain People's Warehouse (founded in 1976, serving the Western U.S.) and Cornucopia Natural Foods (founded in 1977, serving the Eastern U.S.), forming the first natural products distributorship with national scope. Since 1996, other regional distributors have merged with UNFI, filling in the distribution footprint and making UNFI the largest distributor of natural products. 

In 2007 UNFI acquired Millbrook Distribution Services. In 2011, UNFI signed a distribution agreement with Safeway Inc. for the distribution of non-proprietary natural, organic and specialty products. This agreement was terminated by Safeway in July, 2015, leading to a drop in share price and two rounds of layoffs, their first in the history of the company. 

In 2012 UNFI partnered with Buyer's Best Friend to create a unified reordering system. In 2016, the company announced the acquisition of Nor-Cal produce, Inc. It also completed the acquisition of Haddon House Food Products, Inc. in 2016. That same year, it announced the acquisition of Gourmet Guru, Inc. 

On October 22, 2018, UNFI completed the acquisition of SuperValu, Inc.

Divisions
 UNFI Canada
 Alberts Fresh Produce
 Tony's Fine Foods
 Nor-Cal Produce
 UNFI Wellness
 Woodstock Farms
 UNFI Brands+
 Honest Green eSolutions
 UNFI Easy Options

References

Companies formerly listed on the Nasdaq
Companies listed on the New York Stock Exchange
Companies based in Providence, Rhode Island
Organic farming organizations
American companies established in 1996
1996 establishments in Rhode Island